Girlhood Studies: An Interdisciplinary Journal is a peer-reviewed academic journal established in 2008 by Jackie Kirk, Claudia Mitchell, and Jacqueline Reid-Walsh and published by Berghahn Journals. It became an official journal of the International Girls Studies Association (IGSA) in 2019. The journal discusses girlhood from the perspective of a broad range of fields including education, health, media studies, and literary studies. Of the three issues a year, two are themed issues on particular topics. The editor-in-chief is Claudia Mitchell (McGill University). Girlhood Studies: An Interdisciplinary Journal received the award of Best New Journal in the Social Sciences & Humanities from the Association of American Publishers in 2009. The journal led to the establishment of a complementary book series, Transnational Girlhoods, in 2019, also published by Berghahn.

Editors 

 Editor-in-Chief: Claudia Mitchell, McGill University, Canada
 Managing Editor: Ann Smith, McGill University, Canada
 Reviews Editor: Marnina Gonick, Mount St. Vincent University, Canada

Abstracting and indexing 
Girlhood Studies is abstracted and indexed in:

 Bibliometric Research Indicator List (BFI)
 Biography Index (Ebsco)
 Emerging Sciences Citation Index (Web of Science)
 European Reference Index for the Humanities and the Social Sciences (ERIH PLUS)
 MLA International Bibliography
 Norwegian Register for Scientific Journals, Series and Publishers
 Scopus (Elsevier)
 Social Sciences Abstracts (Ebsco)
 Social Sciences Index (Ebsco)
 Studies on Women and Gender Abstracts (Taylor & Francis)
 TOC Premier Table of Contents (Ebsco)
 Women's Studies Librarian: Feminist Periodicals (University of Wisconsin)

References

External links 
 

English-language journals
Sociology journals
Biannual journals
Berghahn Books academic journals
Publications established in 2008